Sein Win is a Burmese politician, who served as Chairman of National Coalition Government of the Union of Burma, a "government in exile". He was made unofficial Prime Minister of the Union of Burma, on being elected by the 1990 People's Assembly known as the National Coalition Government of the Union of Burma, a government-in-exile since 1990.

Biography
Sein Win was born on 16 December 1944 in Taungdwingyi, Magway District, Burma; he was son of Ba Win and Khin Saw. His father Ba Win, was the elder brother of General Aung San and was part of the cabinet of Aung San. Ba Win was assassinated in 1947, together with Aung San and most of the members of the cabinet, just before Burma gained independence. Sein Win received his Bachelor of Science (Hons) degree in mathematics from University of Rangoon in 1966
. He received a diploma in mathematics in 1974, and a Doctorate of Science (Doctor rerum naturalium) from Hamburg University in Germany. He served as a tutor at Rangoon University up to his scholarship to Hamburg University and lecturer at University of Colombo in Sri Lanka from 1980 to 1981 and at Nairobi University in Kenya from 1982 to 1984.

References

Recordings and Photos of the Prime Minister's visit to the College Historical Society on behalf of his cousin Aung San Suu Kyi in October 2007.

Burmese democracy activists
Burmese politicians
Living people
1944 births
People from Magway Division
University of Yangon alumni
University of Hamburg alumni
Academic staff of the University of Colombo
Family of Aung San